Rhynchobatus is a group of rays commonly known as wedgefishes in the family Rhinidae. They are found in the tropical and subtropical Indo-Pacific with a single species (R. luebberti) in the eastern Atlantic. All species in this genus are assessed as Vulnerable or Endangered by IUCN.

The species are superficially similar and have often been confused. The various species can generally be separated by a combination of snout shape, vertebral count and exact colour (distribution of white spots, and presence/absence of a black spot at the base of the pectoral fin).

Species
There are currently seven recognized species in this genus: In the past all the Indo-Pacific species have been confused with R. djiddensis, which as presently defined is restricted to the western Indian Ocean.

 Rhynchobatus australiae Whitley, 1939 (White-spotted wedgefish)
 Rhynchobatus djiddensis (Forsskål, 1775) (Giant guitarfish)
 Rhynchobatus cooki Last,  Kyne & Compagno, 2016 (Roughnose wedgefish)
 Rhynchobatus immaculatus Last, H. C. Ho & R. R. Chen, 2013 (Taiwanese wedgefish)
 Rhynchobatus laevis (Bloch & J. G. Schneider, 1801) (Smoothnose wedgefish)
 Rhynchobatus luebberti Ehrenbaum, 1915 (African wedgefish)
Rhynchobatus mononoke Koeda, Itou, Yamada & Motomura, 2020 (Japanese wedgefish)
 Rhynchobatus palpebratus Compagno & Last, 2008 (Eyebrow wedgefish)
 Rhynchobatus springeri Compagno & Last, 2010 (Broadnose wedgefish)

See also
 List of prehistoric cartilaginous fish

References

 
Rajiformes
Ray genera
Taxa named by Johannes Peter Müller
Taxa named by Friedrich Gustav Jakob Henle
Taxonomy articles created by Polbot